Apple Zapple (formerly known as Ricochet) is a Wild Mouse roller coaster located at Kings Dominion in Doswell, Virginia.

History 
On August 1, 2001, Kings Dominion announced that they would be adding Ricochet. The coaster opened on March 23, 2002.

In February 2018, as part of general renovations to the "Candy Apple Grove" area, it was announced Ricochet would be renamed Apple Zapple, to better fit the area's theme. The ride reopened under its new name on March 24, 2018.

Ride experience

The ride sends a 10-car, 4-person-per-car train along the 1,312.3 ft track at 35 mph. The track layout consists of several high hairpin switchbacks followed by a pair of steep drops.

References

Roller coasters in Virginia
Roller coasters operated by Cedar Fair
Roller coasters introduced in 2002
2002 establishments in Virginia